Samir Lima de Araújo (born October 25, 1981), known as just Samir, is a Brazilian football player who last played for Avispa Fukuoka.

Career
Born in Tuiuti. Samir began his playing career with Bragantino. He joined Vitória in 2001, and made his Campeonato Brasileiro Série A debut for the club in 2002, scoring 2 goals in 12 matches.

In September 2004, Samir signed a contract with China League One side Guangzhou Rizhiquan from Corinthians, replacing Gary Glasgow who injured in the 2006 FIFA World Cup qualification. He made his League One debut on 6 September in a 2 - 1 home win against Zhejiang Greentown. Samir scored in his fourth match for Guangzhou which broke brance of the match in a 1 - 1 draw with Qingdao Hailifeng on 22 September. He scored 3 goals in 16 appearances in the 2004 league season and moved to another League One club Jiangsu Sainty in 2005. He scored only 2 goals in the 2005 league season and was released by the club.

On 18 March 2007, Samir transferred to China League One club Beijing Hongdeng. He played as attacking midfielder in the club and scored his first and only goal of the season on 11 August, in a 3 - 1 home victory against Harbin Yiteng.

Samir moved to Japan and signed a contract with J2 League side Avispa Fukuoka in March 2012 but was released after just one season having made only 9 league appearances.

References

External links

1981 births
Living people
Brazilian footballers
Brazilian expatriate footballers
Brasiliense Futebol Clube players
Expatriate footballers in China
Esporte Clube Vitória players
Campeonato Brasileiro Série A players
Campeonato Brasileiro Série B players
Sport Club Corinthians Paulista players
Clube Atlético Bragantino players
Figueirense FC players
Guarani FC players
Rio Preto Esporte Clube players
Clube do Remo players
Guangzhou F.C. players
Jiangsu F.C. players
Brazilian expatriate sportspeople in China
China League One players
J2 League players
Avispa Fukuoka players
Expatriate footballers in Japan
Association football forwards